Nicolás Pacheco Espinosa (born 23 August 1994) is a Peruvian sport shooter. At the 2012 Summer Olympics he competed in the Men's skeet, finishing in 32nd place. He studied at Newton College.

References

Peruvian male sport shooters
1994 births
Living people
Olympic shooters of Peru
Shooters at the 2012 Summer Olympics
Shooters at the 2015 Pan American Games
South American Games gold medalists for Peru
South American Games medalists in shooting
Competitors at the 2018 South American Games
Pan American Games medalists in shooting
Pan American Games bronze medalists for Peru
Shooters at the 2019 Pan American Games
Medalists at the 2019 Pan American Games
Shooters at the 2020 Summer Olympics
21st-century Peruvian people